Arkwright House may refer to:

Arkwright House, Manchester
Arkwright House, Preston